Open Hearts, is a 2002 Danish drama film directed by Susanne Bier using the minimalist filmmaking techniques of the Dogme 95 manifesto. It stars Mads Mikkelsen, Nikolaj Lie Kaas, Sonja Richter and Paprika Steen. Also referred to as Dogme #28, Open Hearts relates the story of two couples whose lives are traumatized by a car crash and adultery.

Open Hearts received a 93% approval rating on Rotten Tomatoes movie review website. Susanne Bier received the International Critics Award at the 2002 Toronto International Film Festival "for the fact that it proves that dogma has come of age and matured into a potent cinematic language that skillfully captures the freeing of real emotions that extreme trauma creates within the lives of the characters in her film." The film won both the Bodil and Robert awards for Best Danish Film in 2003.

Plot
An engaged couple is torn apart after the man is paralyzed in an accident and the woman falls in love with the husband of the woman who caused the accident. Joachim, a young man, is made a tetraplegic and hospitalized indefinitely by a car crash after being hit by Marie. Marie's husband Niels is a doctor at the hospital, and he falls for Joachim's fiancee Cecilie, and they have an affair. Niels then leaves his wife, teenage daughter and two young boys for Cecilie, who abandons Joachim.

Cast

Soundtrack

The soundtrack for the film was recorded by Indonesian-French singer Anggun. The album was released by Columbia Records and Sony Music International in many countries worldwide during 2002 to 2003. It became Anggun's second and final album to be in the United States, following Snow on the Sahara in 1998. The soundtrack features nine songs written and produced by Jesper Winge Leisner and Niels Brinck, three of which co-written by Anggun.

The album received positive reception from music critics. William Ruhlmann from AllMusic rated it three out five stars, writing that Anggun "matches the propulsive, synthesized musical tracks with breathy, emotive vocals that never lose the beat for all their dramatic appeal." The album's lead single, "Open Your Heart", charted at number 51 on the Norwegian Singles Chart and was nominated for Best Song at the 2003 Robert Awards. "Counting Down" served as a radio-only single in Indonesia, while "I Wanna Hurt You" was released as 12" vinyl single in Italy.

Track listing

Critical reception
The film holds a score of 93% positive reviews on Rotten Tomatoes with the average score of 7.3/10, based on 58 reviews. On Metacritic, the film holds a score of 77 out of 100, based on 22 reviews from professional critics, indicating "generally favorable reviews".

Nick Schager of Slant Magazine said that "Susanne Biers crafts her familiar story with equal doses of austerity and sympathy".

According to Elbert Ventura of PopMatters the film's scenario is "soapy and bedridden", adding that "Open Hearts is perhaps too studiously open-ended, a misstep we'll take considering the movie's refreshing magnanimity".

Cancelled remake
In 2006, Zach Braff was reported to direct, write, and produce an English-language remake of the film following his debut of Garden State. Paramount Pictures won the rights to produce and distribute in a bidding war between Fox Searchlight Pictures and The Weinstein Company. Sean Penn was set to co-star with Braff in the film, but the film collapsed due to scheduling conflicts and budget issues. Despite this, Braff still hopes to one day make the film.

References

External links

2002 drama films
Anggun albums
Best Danish Film Bodil Award winners
Best Danish Film Robert Award winners
Danish drama films
Dogme 95 films
Films directed by Susanne Bier
Films with screenplays by Anders Thomas Jensen